Sätra brunn is a spa town in Sala Municipality, Västmanland County, Sweden. , it had 335 inhabitants. It is most famous for its spa, one of Sweden's oldest health resorts.

Spa 
The Sätra brunn spa house was established in 1700 and is located about 1.4 km from the town. Since 2002, it has been owned by the Sätra Brunn Economic Association.

References

External links 

 Sätra brunn: Web page in English Updated 2016-06-06.

Populated places in Västmanland County
Populated places in Sala Municipality